Mamiko is a Polish publisher located in Nowa Ruda, a charming medieval town with a strong literary tradition (renowned literary festival “Góry Literatury” is held there annually). It was founded in 2000. Since then it has published well over 300 books. Its founder and owner is Apolonia Maliszewska. The name MaMiKo is a combination of the first two letters of the names Magda, Milena, and Kornel – the founder's children. Mamiko specializes in poetry and fiction.

Poets and writers who made their debut thanks to Mamiko are, among others: Wojciech Giedrys, Tomasz Pułka, Elżbieta Lipińska, Grzegorz Mucha, Szymon Bira, Dagmara Babiarz (lives in the United States), Hubert Klimko-Dobrzaniecki (lives in Austria), Piotr Florczyk (lives in the United States), Samantha Kitsch (lives in the United States), Grzegorz Kwiatkowski, Michał Sobol, Marta Fox, Jakub Tabaczek.

Mamiko published also non-fiction books, among them: “Poza kadrem” by Feliks Netz, “Otwórz oczy” by Dagmara Babiarz, “Znad Niemna przez Odrę nad Sekwanę” by Marian Dziwniel, and translation of “Jogging” by Ukrainian writer Andrij Bondar (translated by Bohdan Zadura and Adam Wiedemann).

Literary Awards

Mamiko's authors who won literary awards or were nominated for such awards:

 Wojciech Giedrys was the first-prize winner of the National Literary Contest “Złoty Środek Poezji” 2005 for The Best Poetic Debut in 2004	for his volume of poetry “Ścielenie i grzebanie”.
 Dawid Majer was the first-prize winner of the National Literary Contest “Złoty Środek Poezji” 2010 for The Best Poetic Debut in 2009	for his volume of poetry “Księga grawitacji”.
 Dawid Majer was nominated for the Silesius Literary Award 2010 in the category “The debut of the year” for his volume of poetry “Księga grawitacji”.
 Maciej Bieszczad was the third-prize winner of the National Literary Contest “Złoty Środek Poezji” 2011 for The Best Poetic Debut in 2010 for his volume of poetry “Elipsa”.
 Tomasz Pietrzak was nominated  for the Nike Literary Award 2013 for his volume of poetry “Rekordy”.     
 Piotr Tomczak got an honourable mention of the National Literary Contest “Złoty Środek Poezji” 2014 for The Best Poetic Debut in 2013 for his volume of poetry “Miłość, miłość, zapałki, książkii ikra”.
 Zyta Bętkowska was the first-prize winner of the National Literary Contest “Złoty Środek Poezji” 2017 for The Best Poetic Debut in 2016  for her volume of poetry “Dwa chutory”.
 Jakub Domoradzki was nominated for the “Orfeusz” K.I. Gałczyński Literary Award 2017 for his volume of poetry “Wiersze, których nie lubii mój tata”.
 Jakub Tabaczek was nominated for the Witold Gombrowicz Literary Award 2019 for his short story collection “Czytajcie, co jest wam pisane”.
 Robert Jóźwik was the third-prize winner of the XV Artur Fryz National Literary Contest 2019 for The Best Debut in 2018 for his volume of poetry “Obiecuję ci niewidzialność”.

External links 
 Mamiko - Publisher's official site

Publishing companies of Poland
Mass media in Nowa Ruda
Book publishing companies of Poland